The Yangquan–Dazhai railway is a single-track electrified railway line in Shanxi, China. The section from Yangquan North to Yangquan East is newly constructed, whereas the section from Yangquan East to Dazhai is an upgrade of an existing railway. Services are operated using CRH6F-A units.

History
The project began construction in March 2016. The section from Yangquan North to Yangquan East opened on 24 September 2020. Currently one intermediate station has been constructed, Hedi, but is yet to open.

References

Railway lines in China
Railway lines opened in 2020